EPFC may refer to:

East Perth Football Club
East Preston F.C.
Echo Park Film Center
Eltham Palace F.C.
Europa Point F.C.
Enseignement de promotion et de formation continue